William Cumming may refer to:

William Cumming (Continental Congress) (1724–1797), American lawyer, Continental Congressman for North Carolina
William Cumming (colonel) (1786–1863), American soldier and planter from Augusta, Georgia
William Skeoch Cumming (1864–1929), Scottish watercolourist
William Cumming (politician) (1886–1951), Australian politician
William Cumming (artist) (1917–2010), American artist

See also
William Cumming Henley (1860–1919), English collector and scientist
William Cuming (1769–1852), Irish painter
William Cummings (disambiguation)